, known for his stage name  is a Japanese radio personality, film critic, and film commentator who is represented by the talent agency Horipro. He is nicknamed . From 2012 to 2021, his wife was television caster Izumi Maruoka.

Early life
Arimura was born in Kuala Lumpur, Malaysia in 1976. His father is the Vice President of Choice Hotels and served as a tourist journalist for Fujimura Nobe Sakana, and his mother was chanson singer Mariko Murasakikura.

Arimura got a degree Tamagawa University Faculty of Arts Theater Department, and graduated from the Tokyo Announcement Seminars.

Career
He is mainly a radio personality, and is also a film commentator in magazines and television programs. Arimura was part of Bakademi Kyōkai which they are critics for B-movies. In recent years he is named Sid Arimura.

Arimura also appeared in many variety shows.

Filmography

TV series

Current

Past

Drama

Drama

Radio

Current

Past

Current

References

External links
  
  
 Official profile 
 Interview at Tarento Data Bank 

Japanese radio personalities
Japanese film critics
1976 births
Living people
People from Kuala Lumpur